Hwawon is a town, or eup in Dalseong County, Daegu, South Korea. The township Hwawon-myeon was upgraded to the town Hwawon-eup in 1992. Hwawon Town Office is located in the densely populated Cheonnae-ri.

Communities
Hwawon-eup is divided into 6 villages (ri).

References

External links
Official website 

Dalseong County
Towns and townships in Daegu